Hin Dat railway station is a railway station located in Hin Dat Subdistrict, Huai Thalaeng District, Nakhon Ratchasima Province.

References

External links

Railway stations in Thailand
Nakhon Ratchasima province